David M. Diamond is a neuroscientist and professor at the University of South Florida.

Research
Diamond has researched the neurological conditions that lead parents to forget their children in hot cars. He has also been quoted as an expert regarding the tendency for travelers to forget their belongings, and more generally for people under stress to become more forgetful. he is also known for his research in high cholesterol as cardiovascular risk.

He has explored with Kevin Kip methodology for the selection of therapies for posttraumatic stress disorder in United States Department of Veterans Affairs and United States Department of Defense facilities.

Education and career
Diamond graduated from the University of California, Irvine in 1980 and completed a PhD in biology at UC Irvine in 1985. After postdoctoral research at the UC Irvine Center for the Neurobiology of Learning and Memory, he joined the University of Colorado as an assistant professor in 1986. He moved to the University of South Florida in 1997, and has been the director of the university's Center for Preclinical and Clinical Research on PTSD since 2007.

Selected publications

References

External links
Home page
  David Diamond's expert witness web site

Living people
American neuroscientists
University of California, Irvine alumni
University of Colorado faculty
University of South Florida faculty
Year of birth missing (living people)